Stuart Thornbury Jones (24 January 1929 – 20 July 2015) was a New Zealand cricketer. He played one first-class match for Otago in 1953/54.

Jones died in Christchurch on 20 July 2015, and his ashes were buried in Andersons Bay Cemetery, Dunedin, with his first wife, who died in 1962.

See also
 List of Otago representative cricketers

References

External links
 

1929 births
2015 deaths
People from Naseby, New Zealand
New Zealand cricketers
Otago cricketers
Burials at Andersons Bay Cemetery